Claude Auguste Martin (6 February 1930 – 5 December 2017) was a French rower who competed in the 1952 Summer Olympics and in the 1960 Summer Olympics.

He was born in Paris. In 1952, he was a crew member of the French boat eliminated in the semi-finals of the coxed four event. Eight years later, he won the silver medal with the French boat in the coxed four competition. His death was announced on 13 December 2017. He was 87.

References

1930 births
2017 deaths
French male rowers
Olympic rowers of France
Rowers from Paris
Rowers at the 1952 Summer Olympics
Rowers at the 1960 Summer Olympics
Olympic silver medalists for France
Olympic medalists in rowing
Medalists at the 1960 Summer Olympics
European Rowing Championships medalists
Mediterranean Games medalists in rowing
Mediterranean Games gold medalists for France
Competitors at the 1955 Mediterranean Games
20th-century French people